

Japan Soccer League

Promotion/relegation Series 
Nagoya Mutual Bank lost its place in the League for a second time, this time to Towa Real Estate, which would become one of the biggest names in Japanese football as Fujita Engineering and Bellmare Hiratsuka, currently known as Shonan Bellmare.
 
Towa RE promoted, Nagoya Mutual Bank relegated; NMB resigned from JSL instead of forming Second Division.

References

1971
1
Jap
Jap